Gangster's Kingdom (Spanish:El reino de los gángsters) is a 1948 Mexican crime film written and directed by Juan Orol who also starred in the film. Like Orol's other films it was an attempt to copy the style of Hollywood films of the era.

Cast
 Víctor Alcocer 
 Jorge Arriaga 
 Manuel Arvide 
 Rosa Carmina 
 Roberto Cañedo 
 Roberto Corell 
 Rafael María de Labra
 Francisco Jambrina 
 Cecilia Leger as Mamá  
 Kiko Mendive 
 Juan Orol 
 José Pardavé
 Rafael Plaza Balboa
 Lilia Prado 
 Juanita Riverón
 Joaquín Roche
 Ramón Vallarino
 Armando Velasco 
 Eduardo Vivas 
 Enrique Zambrano

References

Bibliography 
 Daniel Balderston, Mike Gonzalez & Ana M. Lopez. Encyclopedia of Contemporary Latin American and Caribbean Cultures. Routledge, 2002.

External links 
 

1948 films
1948 crime films
Gangster films
Mexican crime films
1940s Spanish-language films
Films directed by Juan Orol

Mexican black-and-white films
1940s Mexican films